Batella is a genus of snapping shrimp comprising three species:
Batella leptocarpus Chace, 1988
Batella parvimanus (Bate, 1888) (syn. Batella bifurcata Miya & Miyake, 1968)
Batella praecipua De Grave, 2004

References

Alpheoidea
Decapod genera
Taxa named by Lipke Holthuis